Michael Hill (born 26 January 1945) is an Australian cricketer. He played fourteen first-class matches for New South Wales between 1964/65 and 1974/75.

See also
 List of New South Wales representative cricketers

References

External links
 

1945 births
Living people
Australian cricketers
Cricketers from Newcastle, New South Wales